Lycée Français Jules Supervielle is a French private school. It is located at Benigno Paiva 1160, in Buceo, Montevideo.

It was originally established in 1897 with the name of Collège Carnot. In September 2001 it was renamed after the French-Uruguayan writer Jules Supervielle. The French government owns the land which houses the school, while the nonprofit organization Sociedad Francesa de Enseñanza (SFE) operates the school.

History

By 2015 the French government and the Sociedad Francesa de Enseñanza engaged in a political conflict regarding the operation of the school. The French Ambassador, Sylvain Itte, sent a letter to parents stating that France may discontinue support of the school on 1 August 2015. If the French government decided to sever its relationship, it would take control of the building and expel the school from it, as well as end its three million euro support. The Uruguayan government became involved, trying to establish a truce between the parties. The Uruguayan government directly contacted the French embassy, and Uruguayan Minister of Education Juan Pedro Mir established contact with SFE president Bernardo Supervielle. The SFE and the French government reached an agreement, keeping the relationship intact. 

On the 6th of October 2017, the school became 120 years old.

Academics
The students learn French, Spanish, and English and the school has an emphasis on languages. The Sección Europea (European Section), an extracurriculum programme, uses mathematics and literature to give additional English instruction.

Student body
As of 2015 there were 1,900 students. About 200 students had scholarships covering 50%-100% of the tuition.

Notable pupils 
 Perla Estable (1933-2017), architect.
 Guido Manini Ríos (1958 - ), military general and politician.
 Alberto Methol Ferré (1929-2009), writer, journalist, historian, philosopher, and theologist.
 Jorge Peirano Facio (1920-2003), jurist, banker, and politician.
 Antonio Pena (1894-1947), sculptor.
 Arturo Scarone (1885-1958), researcher, journalist, and writer. 
 Osiris Rodríguez Castillos (1925—1996), poet, writer, researcher, and composer.
 Estanislao Valdés Otero (1931 - ), lawyer and politician.
 Carlos Maggi (1922-2015), intellectual.
 Manuel Flores Mora (1923-1984), politician.
 Emir Rodríguez Monegal (1921-1985), scholar.

References

External links

 Official site
https://uy.ambafrance.org/Le-Lycee-Francais-Jules,446
 Silvamar, Marcos. "Los niños fueron los privilegiados: Más de un centenar de niños del Liceo Francés tuvieron la oportunidad de presenciar el entrenamiento de Francia en el Parque Central" (Archive). El País / Deportivo Ovación. 4 June 2013.

French international schools in South America
International schools in Uruguay
Private schools in Uruguay
Schools in Montevideo
France–Uruguay relations
French immigration to Uruguay
1897 establishments in Uruguay
Educational institutions established in 1897
Buceo